Just One Look is a 2002 Hong Kong film written and directed by Yip Kam-Hung, and starring Shawn Yue, Anthony Wong and Gillian Chung.

Plot
A young man (Yue) contemplates revenge on the gangster he believes responsible for his father's death. Though his policeman father had committed suicide in a movie theatre toilet ten years earlier, Fan still believes that the local kingpin called "Crazy" (Wong) is somehow responsible for his death. Making a living by selling his family wares in front of a local theater, Fan and his best friend Ming (Wong You-Nam) decide to enlist in a kung fu class to impress the master's daughter Nam (Charlene Choi). Things later get complicated when Fan falls for a mysterious country girl (Chung).

Cast
Shawn Yue - Fan
Gillian Chung - Decimator
Charlene Choi - Nam
Wong You-Nam - Ming
Anthony Wong Chau-sang - Crazy
Andrea Choi - Fan's Mother 
Vincent Kok - Villager #1
Joe Cheung 
Lam Suet 
Chapman To 
Shu Qi (cameo)
Eric Kot 
Li Fung 
Jo Kuk 
Sam Lee

External links

 HK Cinemagic entry

Hong Kong romantic comedy-drama films
2002 films
2000s Cantonese-language films
2000s Hong Kong films